Jamie Oehlers is an Australian jazz saxophonist. Winner of the World Saxophone competition in 2005, Jamie is recognised as one of Australia's leading jazz artists, performing at festivals and clubs around the globe. He was nominated for ARIA Awards for Best Jazz Album in 1999 (Jamie Oehlers - Strut), in 2005 (Oehlers & Keevers - Grace) and in 2008 (Oehlers, Grabowsky & Beck - Lost And Found) and has won multiple Australia Jazz Bell Awards for Best Jazz Release, as well as Australian Jazz Artist of the Year. Jamie is also the Head of Jazz Studies at the prestigious Western Australian Academy of Performing Arts.

Discography

Albums

Awards and nominations

AIR Awards
The Australian Independent Record Awards (commonly known informally as AIR Awards) is an annual awards night to recognise, promote and celebrate the success of Australia's Independent Music sector.

|-
| AIR Awards of 2008
|Lost and Found 
| Best Independent Jazz Album
| 
|-
| AIR Awards of 2010
|On a Clear Day 
| Best Independent Jazz Album
| 
|-

ARIA Music Awards
The ARIA Music Awards is an annual awards ceremony that recognises excellence, innovation, and achievement across all genres of Australian music. Oehlers has been nominated for three awards.

|-
| 1999
| Strut
| Best Jazz Album
| 
|-
| 2005
| Grace 
| Best Jazz Album
| 
|-
| 2008
| Lost and Found 
| Best Jazz Album
| 
|-

Australian Jazz Bell Awards
The Australian Jazz Bell Awards, (also known as the Bell Awards or The Bells), are annual music awards for the jazz music genre in Australia. They commenced in 2003. 

|-
| 2006 
| The Assemblers by Jamie Oehlers
| Best Australian Contemporary Jazz Album
| 
|-
| 2007 
| Jamie Oehlers
| Australian Jazz Artist of the Year
| 
|-
| 2007 
| You R Here - Session 2 – Jamie Oehlers Double Drummer Group
| Best Australian Contemporary Jazz Album
| 
|-
| 2009
| Lost and Found (as Oehlers, Grabowsky, Beck)
| Best Australian Contemporary Jazz Album
| 
|-

 Note wins only

References

External links
Jamie Oehlers - Jazz Saxophonist

Living people
Australian musicians
Year of birth missing (living people)